Jeffrey Thomas Simmons (born July 6, 1960) is a former American football wide receiver in the National Football League who played for the Los Angeles Rams. He played college football for the USC Trojans.

References

1960 births
Living people
American football wide receivers
Los Angeles Rams players
USC Trojans football players